Aisling Franciosi (born 6 June 1993) is an Irish actress. She won an AACTA Award for her leading role in the film The Nightingale (2018). On television, she is known for her roles in the RTÉ-BBC Two crime drama The Fall (2013–2016), season 2 of the TNT series Legends (2015), and the BBC One miniseries Black Narcissus (2020).

Early life
Franciosi was born in Dublin on 6 June 1993, the daughter of an Irish mother and Italian father. She has two older brothers and a younger sister. She attended Trinity College Dublin.

Career
From 2013 to 2016, Franciosi starred as Katie Benedetto in the RTÉ and BBC Two crime drama series The Fall. She made her feature film debut in 2014 in Jimmy's Hall. The following year, she starred in the second season of the TNT series Legends as Kate Crawford.

In 2016, Franciosi appeared in the HBO series Game of Thrones in the sixth season as Lyanna Stark and reprised her role in the seventh season. She landed the lead role of Clare Carroll in The Nightingale, a 2018 period drama set in Tasmania and directed by Jennifer Kent. For The Nightingale, Francioisi received critical acclaim and a number of accolades including an AACTA. She also had supporting and recurring roles season 1 of the BBC thriller Clique as Georgia Cunningham and the Picasso installment of the National Geographic television anthology Genius as Fernande Olivier.

Franciosi played Sister Ruth in the 2020 miniseries Black Narcissus opposite Gemma Arterton and appeared in the films Home, The Unforgivable, and God's Creatures. She has upcoming film roles in the biographical-drama film Rothko, directed by Sam Taylor-Johnson, as well as the horror film The Last Voyage of the Demeter.

Personal life
Franciosi is fluent in English, Irish, and Italian. She also studied French and Spanish at university.

Filmography

Film

Television

Awards and nominations

References

External links
 

Living people
1993 births
21st-century Irish actresses
Actresses from Dublin (city)
Alumni of Trinity College Dublin
Irish film actresses
Irish people of Italian descent
Irish television actresses
Best Actress AACTA Award winners